Topaz Road is a national park in Far North Queensland, Australia, 1,348 km northwest of Brisbane. It covers an area of 0.4 km2. According to the Queensland Government, "Topaz Road National Park protects remnant rainforest in the upper Johnstone River catchment. The park and nearby nature refuges form a network of protected areas that adjoin Wooroonooran National Park, providing habitat connectivity for a wide variety of Wet Tropics species."

See also

 Protected areas of Queensland

References

National parks of Far North Queensland
Protected areas established in 1977
1977 establishments in Australia